The Ruebel Hotel is a historic hotel located at 207–215 E. Main St. in Grafton, Illinois. Built in 1913, the structure is the second hotel building on the site; the original Ruebel Hotel was built in 1879 and burned down in 1912. The Commercial style building features decorative brickwork typical of the style; the building's cornice has brick corbelling, and raised brick panels decorate the space above the second-story brick arched windows. The hotel, which also included a saloon and a restaurant, gained a reputation as one of the best in Jersey County. It is the only surviving hotel in Grafton.

The hotel was added to the National Register of Historic Places on February 16, 1994.

References

Hotel buildings on the National Register of Historic Places in Illinois
Commercial architecture in Illinois
Hotel buildings completed in 1913
Buildings and structures in Jersey County, Illinois
1913 establishments in Illinois
National Register of Historic Places in Jersey County, Illinois